Kaïs Nasri (born August 21, 2002) is a French-Algerian footballer who plays as a midfielder for JS Kabylie in the Algerian Ligue Professionnelle 1.

Career
In August 2020, Nasri joined Italian club S.S. Lazio. On 28 June 2022, he transferred to the Algerian club JS Kabylie.

Personal life
Born in France, Nasri is of Algerian descent. He is the cousin of professional footballer Samir Nasri.

References

External links
 

2002 births
Living people
Sportspeople from Marseille
French footballers
Algerian footballers
French sportspeople of Algerian descent
Algerian Ligue Professionnelle 1 players
JS Kabylie players
Association football midfielders